This is a list of acts of the Parliament of South Africa enacted in the years 1950 to 1959.

South African acts are uniquely identified by the year of passage and an act number within that year. Some acts have gone by more than one short title in the course of their existence; in such cases each title is listed with the years in which it applied.

1950

1951

1952

1953

1954

1955

1956

1957

1958

1959

References
 Government Gazette of the Union of South Africa, Volumes CLIX–CXCVII.
 

1950